Mobhí Clárainech (also Berchan; died 544) was an Irish early monastic saint, counted as one of the Twelve Apostles of Ireland. He was the abbot of a monastery in Glasnevin, where he was a teacher of Columba, Canice, Comgall, and Ciarán.

Background
In John Colgan's work Trias Thaumaturga he is called "Berchan, that is, Mobhi Clairenach, of Glasnevin, son of Beoain, son of Bresal, son of Ailgin, son of Ignaidh, son of Athraid and Lugnaidh, Trinog, son of Brecdulb, son of Airt Corp, son of Caerbreniadh, in Glasnevin, in the territory of Galeny, near the River Liffey" (in regione Gallangabeg juxta Liffeum flumen). He was a relative of Brigit of Kildare.

The Martyrology of Oengus calls him "son of Beóán, of Corco trí, of the Luigni of Connaught," and says that his mother was "Uaine, Findbarr's daughter."

Life
His surname, clárainech, means "flat faced" in Irish, a reference to his being born without eyes or a nose. The Martyrology of Oengus mentions that he was "table faced," ascribing the condition to the fact that he had been "conceived and brought forth, and of a dead woman he was begotten." The immediate cause of his strange physiognomy was that the "earth pressed him down" during the unfortunate circumstances of his birth. He was said to have been miraculously cured of this deformity when he splashed the baptismal water of Saint David on his face three times.

Mobhí was the teacher of a monastic school, where he was the tutor of many influential Irish saints. His school had about fifty students at its height. A legend is recorded about Mobhí and Columba (also called Columcille) that elaborates on the condition of these monastic schools:

It was Mobhí who gave Columba permission, with his last breath, to found the School of Derry. He died on 12 October 544 of the plague that had broken up his school.

Veneration
Mobhí was recognised as a saint by his own pupils soon after his death. The 17th-century Martyrology of Donegal recounts the story that when Columba was preparing to take possession of the town of Doire from Aedh, son of Ainmire, he initially refused to do so because he did not have his Mobhí's permission. It was only when two of Mobhí's followers met him, carrying the saint's girdle, and informed Columba that Mobhí was dead, that he accepted. Columba then remarked, "Good was the man who had this girdle, for it was never opened for gluttony, nor closed on falsehood." Columba later expanded that sentiment into a quatrain:

Archbishop John Healy, in his book Insula Sanctorum et Doctorum, called Saint Mobhí "a great master of the spiritual life."

His feast day is celebrated on 12 October, and today there is a Church of Ireland parish in Glasnevin named for Saint Mobhí.

Martyrologies
The Martyrology of Oengus (c. 800)—the earliest Irish calendar of saints—lists the following on 12 October:

The Martyrology of Donegal lists him on 12 October, the day of his death, and commemorates him in the following manner: "Mobhi Clairenech, abbot, of Glass Naoidhen, in Fine-Gall, on the brink of the river Lifè, on the north side; and Bearchán was another name for him."

References

Medieval saints of Leinster
6th-century Irish abbots
6th-century Christian saints
6th-century deaths from plague (disease)
544 deaths
Year of birth missing